MS  Siritara Ocean Queen was a cruise ship owned since 2006 by Siritara Enterprise in Thailand. She was built in 1964 by VEB Mathias-Thesen Werft, Wismar, East Germany as Bashkiriya for the Soviet Union's Black Sea Shipping Company. It was named after an Autonomous Soviet Socialist Republic in the former Soviet Union Bashkir Autonomous Soviet Socialist Republic. The ship capsized 10 October 2006 and was a total loss. She was later scrapped on site.

See also
 List of cruise ships

References

External links

 Siritara Ocean Queen (Башкирия → 1992 Odessa Song → 1997 Royal Dream → 06.1998 Silver Star → 06.2003 Nandini → 11.2003 Olviara → 11.2004 Ocean Princess → 09.2006) 

Cruise ships
Ships built in East Germany
Passenger ships of the Soviet Union
East Germany–Soviet Union relations
1963 ships
Ships built in Wismar
Ships of Black Sea Shipping Company